Karsten Oswald (born 30 June 1975) is a German former footballer.

References

External links

1975 births
Living people
German footballers
Association football midfielders
Chemnitzer FC players
FC Bayern Munich II players
Dynamo Dresden players
FC Sachsen Leipzig players
VfL Halle 1896 players
2. Bundesliga players